The Uva Province Rugby Football Union (UPRFU) is the governing body for rugby union in Uva Province, Sri Lanka.

See also
 Sri Lanka Rugby Football Union

References

External links
 Official website
 Provincial Unions

Sri Lankan rugby union governing bodies
Rugby